John Wesley LaGrone III (November 4, 1944 – March 27, 2022) was an American professional gridiron football player who played for the Canadian Football League's Edmonton Eskimos.

CFL
After playing college football at Southern Methodist University, where he was an All-American, LaGrone spent his entire eight-year CFL career from 1967 to 1974 as a defensive tackle. He was named a Western Conference All-Star six times, a CFL All-Star twice, and won the CFL's Most Outstanding Lineman Award in 1969.

The Eskimos never won a Grey Cup during his time with them, losing twice under head coach Ray Jauch, the 61st Grey Cup of 1973 and the 62nd Grey Cup of 1974, to Ottawa and Montreal respectively.

Post-football
Since 1990, LaGrone served as a judge in Hutchinson County, Texas. He died on March 27, 2022, at the age of 77.

Statistics and photo
Lagrone stats

Further reading

References

1944 births
2022 deaths
All-American college football players
American players of Canadian football
Canadian football defensive linemen
Edmonton Elks players
Players of American football from Texas
People from Borger, Texas
SMU Mustangs football players
Texas state court judges
20th-century American judges